Firdous Jamal is a Pakistani television, theatre, stage and film actor.

Beginning his career with a Hindko drama serial called Badnami Dey Toway in the mid-1970s, he has since then acted in at least 300 TV plays, 150 stage plays, 200 radio plays and 50 films, with his work consisting in all the languages of Pakistan.

Family
His son Hamza Firdous is an actor, an "award winning web drama producer and actor in Ireland" who has had roles in dramas like O Rangreza or Ghughi, while another son, Bilawal Firdous, is a model and aspiring actor, with whom he opened his own production house, Firdous Jamal Films.

Filmography

Films

Television serials

Awards
Pride of Performance Award by the President of Pakistan in 1986.

References

Living people
1954 births
Pakistani male television actors
People from Peshawar
Punjabi people
Pakistan Television Corporation people
Recipients of the Pride of Performance